Terrible's SCORE Primm 300 is an off-road race that takes place yearly in Primm, Nevada in September. The Primm 300 is part of a series of races that include the Baja 1000, Baja 500 and San Felipe 250.  The event includes various types of vehicle classes such as stock VW, production vehicles, buggies, trucks, and custom fabricated race vehicles.  The race consists of 4 loops on a 69 mile course on the east side of Interstate 15 near the Nevada-California state line.  The main pits and start/finish area are just north of Buffalo Bills Resort.  Due to environmental concerns chasing is not allowed, pits are permitted only in designated locations, spectator access is limited but available.

Current and past classes

Cars and Trucks
SCORE Trophy Truck: Open Production Unlimited Trucks.
SCORE Class 1: Unlimited open-wheel single- or two-seaters.
SCORE Class 1/2-1600: Limited suspension. open-wheel single- or two-seaters. (1600 cc)
SCORE Class 2: Limited 2.2 liter buggy.
SCORE Class 3: Production short wheelbase 4X4 Jeeps.
SCORE Class 4: Unlimited 2.2 liter open wheel.
SCORE Class 5: Unlimited Baja Bugs.
SCORE Class 5-1600: Baja Bugs. (1600cc) 
SCORE Class 6: V6 powered tube chassis trucks
SCORE Class 7: Open mini trucks.
SCORE Class 7S: Stock mini trucks. (3000cc)
SCORE Class 7SX: Modified mini trucks. (4000cc)
SCORE Class 8: Full-sized two-wheel drive trucks.
SCORE Class 9: Short wheelbase, open-wheel. single- or two-seaters. (1600cc)
SCORE Class 10: Open-wheel single or two-seaters. (2000cc)
SCORE Class 11: Stock VW Sedans. (1600cc)
SCORE Lites Class 12: VW limited open-wheel. single seat(1776cc) or two-seaters(1835cc).
SCORE Class 17: Production short wheelbase 4X4 Modified Jeeps.
SCORE Stock Full: Stock full-sized trucks.
SCORE Stock Mini: Stock mini trucks. (4300cc)
SCORE Baja Challenge:  Limited, identical open-wheel Baja touring cars.
SCORE Sportsman Buggy:
SCORE Sportsman Truck:
SCORE Sportsman UTV: 660cc, 4-wheel utility vehicle.

Overall winners

References
2010 Primm 300 (https://web.archive.org/web/20101127205327/http://score-international.com/446/news/Primm_300_Official_Race_Results.aspx)
2009 Primm 300 Race Results Press Release
SCORE International (2006). "2006-2010 Off-Road Racing Rules and Regulations".
SCORE International. " 2009 New Classes & Existing Class Rule Amendments"

External links
Official SCORE International website

See also
 SCORE International
 San Felipe 250 (San Felipe, Baja California loop in February or March)
 Baja 500 (Ensenada loop in June)
 Baja 1000 (from Ensenada in November)

Rally raid races
Motorcycle races
Motorsport competitions in the United States
Motorsport in Nevada